Ugo Grappasonni (8 May 1922 – 16 February 1999) was an Italian professional golfer.

Grappasonni was born in Rome and was one of the leading golfers in Italy, winning his national open twice, in 1950 and 1954, and the National Omnium on four occasions. He also won the French, Dutch and Swiss Opens, the latter twice. His son, Silvio, is also a professional golfer.

Grappasonni was also a teaching professional at the Villa d'Este Golf Club. Along with Aldo Casera and Alfonso Angelini he founded the Professional Golfer's Association of Italy in 1962. The three men were known as the "three musketeers".

Tournament wins
1941 Italian National Omnium
1948 Swiss Open
1949 French Open
1950 Italian Open
1952 Swiss Open
1953 Moroccan Open, Open del Ticino
1954 Dutch Open, Italian Open, Italian National Omnium
1955 Italian National Omnium
1957 Italian National Omnium

Results in major championships

Note: Grappasonni only played in The Open Championship.

CUT = missed the half-way cut
"T" = tied

Team appearances
Continental Europe–United States: (representing Continental Europe): 1953
Canada Cup (representing Italy): 1954, 1955, 1956, 1957, 1959
Joy Cup: (representing the Rest of Europe): 1954, 1955, 1956

References

Italian male golfers
Sportspeople from Rome
1922 births
1999 deaths